This is a list of websites with country access restrictions.

Reactions 

Notepad++ project moved its website outside the United States after SourceForge started to apply access restrictions.

In 2009, Juventud Rebelde criticised Microsoft for blocking MSN Messenger in Cuba.

In 2014, edX MOOC platform published a statement saying "we have never blocked students from receiving education on the edX platform because of where they live".

References 

Country access restrictions